Sawi, Savi, or Sauji, is an endangered Indo-Aryan language spoken in northeastern Afghanistan and north-western Pakistan. It is classified as a member of the Shina language cluster within the Dardic subgroup.

Sawi speakers consider themselves part of the Gawar ethnic group, which is found in half a dozen of the surrounding villages and whose language is Gawarbati. In communicating with them, the people of Sau reportedly resort to using Pashto.
During the long period of unrest, the population of the village was displaced into refugee camps in Chitral and Dir, but reportedly many people have now returned to Afghanistan.

History 
The closest relative of the Sawi language is the southern variety of Palula spoken in Ashret further up the Kunar Valley in Chitral. Many Sawi speakers are aware of the similarity between the two languages, and some consider the people of Ashret as their "brothers". Henrik Liljegren's study of the shared linguistic features and the local oral traditions suggest that the ancestors of these language communities are likely to have migrated from the present-day Diamer District on the Indus River. There was probably an early split between Northern and Southern Palula, with Sawi subsequently branching off from the latter. The current similarity between the two varieties of Palula is then explained as a result of convergence.

Grammar 
The presence of weak voiced aspirates was cautiously reported by Buddruss in 1967, but  found them to be absent from the speech of his consultant(s). It is likely that the loss of aspiration in the ancestor language could have been related to the development of a tone system.

Possibly under the influence of Gawarbati, Sawi has developed a voiceless lateral fricative  out of the *tr consonant clusters of the earlier language, compare for example Sawi ɬo with Southern Palula tróo 'three'.

Unlike the main Shina varieties, where the past and present tense are typically marked for person, Sawi and Palula verb tenses are almost entirely participle-based, with only traces of agreement for person.
Like Torwali, Sawi has grammaticalised the category of animacy in its nominal morphology (in contrast to Kalasha, Khowar, Shumashti and Pashai, where animacy has instead been grammaticalised in the verbal morphology). 
The agent suffix is -e for perfective transitive verbs. Unlike the main Shina varieties, Sawi does not seem to possess an agent suffix for imperfective transitive verbs.

References

Bibliography 

Dardic languages
Languages of Afghanistan
Languages of Pakistan